The 1949 season was the Chicago Bears' 30th in the National Football League.  The team failed to improve on their 10–2 record from 1948 and finished with a 9–3 record,  under head coach and owner George Halas, but finished in second place in the NFL Western Division for a third time, missing out on a chance to add more league titles to their trophy case. The Bears were 3–3 at mid-season, then won their final six games.

The Los Angeles Rams (8–2–2) defeated the Bears twice, and won the division title.  (Ties were disregarded in winning percentage calculation until .)

Regular season

Schedule

Standings

References

Chicago Bears
Chicago Bears seasons
Chicago Bears